Ellen Douglas was the pen name of Josephine Ayres Haxton (July 12, 1921 – November 7, 2012), an American author. Her 1973 novel Apostles of Light was a National Book Award nominee.

Biography

Douglas was born in Natchez, Mississippi, and grew up in Hope, Arkansas, and Alexandria, Louisiana. She graduated from the University of Mississippi in 1942 and later settled in Greenville, Mississippi with her husband Kenneth Haxton. She had three sons with Haxton: Richard, Brooks and Ayres. She later taught writing at Ole' Miss. She adopted the pen name Ellen Douglas before the publication of A Family’s Affairs to protect the privacy of two aunts, on whose lives she had based much of the plot.

Douglas died of heart failure at the age of 91 on November 7, 2012.  Her son Brooks Haxton has become a notable, award-winning poet and writer.

Margalit Fox writes that Douglas's work "explored the epochal divide between the Old South and the New, examining vast, difficult subjects — race relations, tensions between the sexes, the conflict between the needs of the individual and those of the community — through the small, clear prism of domestic life."

Selected bibliography

Novels and stories
 A Family's Affairs (1961)
 Black Cloud, White Cloud: Two Novellas and Two Stories (1963)
 "On the Lake", in Prize Stories 1963 (1963)
 Where The Dreams Cross (1968)
 Apostles of Light (Houghton Mifflin 1973)
 The Rock Cried Out (1979)
 A Lifetime Burning (Random House 1982)
 A Long Night (1986)
 The Magic Carpet and Other Tales (1987)
 Can't Quit You, Baby (Scribner 1988)

Nonfiction
 Truth: Four Stories I Am Finally Old Enough to Tell (Algonquin Books 1998) 
 Witnessing (University Press of Mississippi 2004)

References

External links
Mississippi writers page: Ellen Douglas (Josephine Ayres Haxton)
Mississippi writers: Ellen Douglas

1921 births
2012 deaths
American women novelists
University of Mississippi faculty
People from Natchez, Mississippi
University of Mississippi alumni
Novelists from Mississippi
American women short story writers
20th-century American novelists
20th-century American short story writers
20th-century American women writers
21st-century American non-fiction writers
21st-century American women writers
Writers of American Southern literature
Pseudonymous women writers
American women non-fiction writers
American women academics
20th-century pseudonymous writers
21st-century pseudonymous writers
People from Hope, Arkansas
People from Alexandria, Louisiana